Dasi Ruz (professionally also known as Ingrid Ruz) is an Australian actress who has been in several films and television shows.

Ruz is known for her role in the 2007 action-thriller film, The Condemned, written and directed by Scott Wiper. Ruz's character is Rosa, who was awaiting execution in Mexico with her husband, Paco. Rosa and her husband are chosen as contestants and taken to an isolated island, where the program would take place.

Ruz has also appeared on The Starter Wife, The Bill, Water Rats, Blue Heelers, and Above the Law.

Film and television appearances
The Starter Wife (2007) ... Ana
The Condemned (2007) ... Rosa
Happy Feet (2006) ... Live Action Cast
 The Angel Files (2002) ... Prudence "Pru" Fisher (as Ingrid Ruz)
Play School (2001) ... Dasi Ruz (Herself)
The Bill (2001) ... Agent Costas (as Ingrid Ruz)
Water Rats (2001) ... Sgt. Vanessa Simmons (as Ingrid Ruz)
Blue Heelers (2001) ... Becky Jacobs (as Ingrid Ruz)
Above the Law (2000) ... Vicki Giovanelli (as Ingrid Ruz)
 Queen Kat, Carmel & St. Jude (1999) ... Jude Torres (as Ingrid Ruz)
 State Corner (1998) ... Siobhan Kearns (as Ingrid Ruz)
 Never Tell Me Never (1998) ... Nurse Sue (as Ingrid Ruz)

External links

References 

Year of birth missing (living people)
Living people
Australian film actresses
Australian television actresses
Australian children's television presenters
Australian women television presenters